Bansari is a Bollywood social film. It was released in 1943. Music composition was by Gyan Dutt with lyrics written by D. N. Madhok. The film was produced by Chandulal Shah for Ranjit Studios. Directed by Jayant Desai, it starred Ishwarlal, Noor Mohammed Charlie, Dixit, Shamim Bano, Kesari and Urmila.

The film had Charlie playing a "social parasite" and the acting was severely criticised by the critic of "Filmindia" as "putrid" and "obscene". The film however was a big success at the box-office. This was also Charlie's last film for Ranjit Studios as he became a "freelancer" soon after.

Cast
 Ishwarlal
 Charlie
 Shamim Bano
 Dixit
 Kesari
 Urmila
 Bhagwandas

Jayant Desai
The film was Jayant Desai's last one for Ranjit Studios. He had started his career with Ranjit since 1929 as an assistant and went on to become a "stock director", directing films, which Chandulal Shah "did not want to direct". Desai left Ranjit in 1943 to form his own company "Jayant Desai Productions" under which his first film was Bhaktaraj (1943).

Soundtrack
Bansuri had music composed by Gyan Dutt and the lyricist were D. N. Madhok and Pandit Indra. The singers were Noor Mohammed Charlie, Shamim Akhtar, Leela Sawant and Bulo C. Rani.

Songlist

References

External links
 

1943 films
1940s Hindi-language films
Indian black-and-white films
Films directed by Jayant Desai